A Character map utility allows a user to view and enter characters without having a relevant keyboard layout. Implementations include:

Character Map (Windows), component of Microsoft Windows for viewing and copying characters
GNOME Character Map, utility of GNOME for viewing and entering characters
Haiku CharacterMap, component of the Haiku Operating System for viewing and entering characters